First Samurai is a thoroughbred race horse born February 2, 2003.  He was a contender for the Triple Crown in 2006, but a starting gate incident contributed to his defeat in the Blue Grass Stakes.  Two weeks after the race, First Samurai was diagnosed with two broken ribs following an ultrasound.  He was not entered in the Kentucky Derby, with his injury cited as the reason. The Blue Grass ultimately proved to be his final race.

Connections

First Samurai is owned by Bruce Lunsford Tom Hansen, Tom Morris & Raymond Coudriet and is trained by Frank Brothers.  He has been ridden by Pat Day and Jerry Bailey, both jockeys now retired, and the still racing Edgar Prado. First Samurai was bred in Kentucky by John D. Gunther.

Races

In his career, cut short by injury, he started 8 times, winning 5, placing in 1, showing in 1, with total earnings of $915,075

Stud career
First Samurai stands at stud at the Hancock Family's Claiborne Farm near Paris, Kentucky.  His starting fee in 2007 was $40,000 and stood alongside Claiborne's other stallions, which included Pulpit, Seeking the Gold, During, Eddington, and Strong Hope.

First Samurai's descendants include:

c = colt, f = filly

Pedigree

References

External links
 First Samurai's pedigree
 National Thoroughbred Racing Association bio

2003 racehorse births
Racehorses trained in the United States
Racehorses bred in Kentucky
Thoroughbred family 13